The Red Stallion is a 1947 American Western film directed by Lesley Selander shot in Cinecolor. It is about a young boy who trains his beloved pet horse to be a racehorse in order to save his grandmother's farm from foreclosure.

Plot summary
Joel Curtis (Ted Donaldson) is a young orphan who is living with his grandmother, Aggie Curtis (Jane Darwell), on her ranch. Joel finds an orphaned colt in the nearby woods, and names the horse Red. Joel learns that Grandma Curtis has extensive debts, and will be forced to sell her ranch to pay them off. Joel is friends with Andy McBride (Robert Paige), a ranch hand at the nearby Moresby Farms. Joel convinces Andy to help him train Red as a racehorse, with the intention of selling his beloved horse to pay off his grandmother's debts.

Joel and Andy convinced Moresby Farms horse trainer Ellen Reynolds (Noreen Nash) to race Red against the farm's best racehorse, Black Moor. But the untrained Red loses the race because he does not stay close to the inside rail. Joel next approaches Mr. Moresby (Pierre Watkin) with an offer to sell horses from the Curtis ranch to Moresby Farms. Mr. Moresby agrees, but says he will buy only those horses which can outrace Black Moor. With the foreclosure auction on Grandma Curtis' farm approaching quickly, Joel and Ho-Na (Robert Bice), a Native American working for Grandma Curtis, train Red on Moresby's racetrack nightly. Joel's dog, Curley, helps by barking at Red and forcing the horse against the rail whenever Red tries to stray.

Moresby promises to see Red race one more time first thing in the morning on the day before the auction. But that night, Red escapes the barn and goes into the woods, where a bear attacks him. Red escapes, but is too exhausted to race. The next day, Joel races Red against Black Moor and beats Moresby's horse. Moresby purchases Red for a large sum, saving Grandma Curtis' ranch. At Grandma Curtis' suggestion, Moresby makes Joel co-owner of Red. Andy and Ellen reveal they are in love.

Cast 
Robert Paige as Andy McBride
Noreen Nash as Ellen Reynolds
Ted Donaldson as Joel Curtis
Jane Darwell as Mrs. Aggie Curtis
Ray Collins as Perry Barton
Guy Kibbee as Ed Thompson
Willie Best as Jackson
Robert Bice as Ho-Na
Pierre Watkin as Richard Moresby
Bill Cartledge as Johnny Stevens
Daisy as Curley the dog

References

External links 

1947 films
1940s English-language films
1947 Western (genre) films
Films directed by Lesley Selander
Films scored by Friedrich Hollaender
Eagle-Lion Films films
Cinecolor films
Films about horses
American Western (genre) films
1940s American films